Macdoel is a census-designated place (CDP) in Siskiyou County, California, United States. Macdoel is located on U.S. Route 97 approximately halfway between Klamath Falls, Oregon and Weed.  Its population is 86 as of the 2020 census, down from 133 from the 2010 census.

History

In 2021, portions of Macdoel were placed under mandatory evacuation for fourteen days due to the Tennant Fire, which burned  in the area.

Geography
Macdoel is located at  (41.826675, -122.005389).

Climate
This region experiences warm (but not hot) and dry summers, with no average monthly temperatures above 71.6 °F.  According to the Köppen Climate Classification system, Macdoel has a warm-summer Mediterranean climate, abbreviated "Csb" on climate maps.

Demographics

2010
At the 2010 census Macdoel had a population of 133. The racial makeup of Macdoel was 57 (42.9%) White, 0 (0.0%) African American, 6 (4.5%) Native American, 0 (0.0%) Asian, 0 (0.0%) Pacific Islander, 69 (51.9%) from other races, and 1 (0.8%) from two or more races. Hispanic or Latino of any race were 78 people (58.6%).

The whole population lived in households, no one lived in non-institutionalized group quarters and no one was institutionalized.

There were 41 households, 19 (46.3%) had children under the age of 18 living in them, 21 (51.2%) were opposite-sex married couples living together, 4 (9.8%) had a female householder with no husband present, 4 (9.8%) had a male householder with no wife present.  There were 3 (7.3%) unmarried opposite-sex partnerships, and 0 (0%) same-sex married couples or partnerships. 8 households (19.5%) were one person and 4 (9.8%) had someone living alone who was 65 or older. The average household size was 3.24.  There were 29 families (70.7% of households); the average family size was 3.55.

The age distribution was 44 people (33.1%) under the age of 18, 9 people (6.8%) aged 18 to 24, 44 people (33.1%) aged 25 to 44, 24 people (18.0%) aged 45 to 64, and 12 people (9.0%) who were 65 or older.  The median age was 30.6 years. For every 100 females, there were 129.3 males.  For every 100 females age 18 and over, there were 128.2 males.

There were 43 housing units at an average density of 290.3 per square mile, of the occupied units 18 (43.9%) were owner-occupied and 23 (56.1%) were rented. The homeowner vacancy rate was 0%; the rental vacancy rate was 0%.  46 people (34.6% of the population) lived in owner-occupied housing units and 87 people (65.4%) lived in rental housing units.

2000
At the 2000 census there were 140 people, 37 households, and 29 families in the CDP. The racial makeup of the CDP was 35.71% White, 8.57% Native American, 5.71% Asian, 49.29% from other races, and 0.71% from two or more races. Hispanic or Latino of any race were 63.57%.

Of the 37 households 48.6% had children under the age of 18 living with them, 54.1% were married couples living together, 13.5% had a female householder with no husband present, and 21.6% were non-families. 10.8% of households were one person and 8.1% were one person aged 65 or older. The average household size was 3.78 and the average family size was 4.38.

The age distribution was 39.3% under the age of 18, 14.3% from 18 to 24, 30.0% from 25 to 44, 8.6% from 45 to 64, and 7.9% 65 or older. The median age was 22 years. For every 100 females, there were 125.8 males. For every 100 females age 18 and over, there were 129.7 males.

The median household income was $23,750 and the median family income  was $27,500. Males had a median income of $15,625 versus $16,250 for females. The per capita income for the CDP was $8,244. There were 18.8% of families and 20.2% of the population living below the poverty line, including 17.0% of under eighteens and none of those over 64.

Politics

See also
Archeological Site 4-SK-4

References

Census-designated places in Siskiyou County, California
Census-designated places in California